The Movement of Ecologists – Citizens' Cooperation (KOSP), formerly known as the Ecological and Environmental Movement, is a green political party in Cyprus.

In both the 2001 and 2006 legislative elections, the party won 2.0% of the popular vote and 1 of 56 seats. In 2011, it garnered 2.2% of the popular vote, and its sole parliamentarian, George Perdikes, retained his seat.

The party increased its seat count from 1 to 2 following the 2016 legislative elections, where it obtained 4.8% of the vote, coming in seventh place. In the same year, the party adopted its current name and a new logo.

Election results

Parliament

References

External links
Official website

Political parties in Cyprus
Green parties in Europe
European Green Party
Global Greens member parties